Lü Yu'e (born 8 October 1960) is a Chinese former cyclist. She competed in the women's road race event at the 1984 Summer Olympics.

References

External links
 

1960 births
Living people
Chinese female cyclists
Olympic cyclists of China
Cyclists at the 1984 Summer Olympics
Place of birth missing (living people)
20th-century Chinese women